Grimstone is a hamlet at the confluence of Sydling Water and the River Frome in the western part of the civil parish of Stratton, Dorset.

The Great Western Railway opened Grimstone and Frampton railway station and Grimstone Viaduct in 1857 and British Railways closed the station in 1966.

The hamlet is the home of Manor Foods, a catering company located at Manor Farm.

Grimstone's common lands were not enclosed until 1907.

Gallery

References

Hamlets in Dorset
West Dorset District